Mohabbat (translation: Love/Romance) is an Indian Hindi romantic film directed by Reema Nath and starring Madhuri Dixit, Sanjay Kapoor, and Akshay Khanna. The film was released on 19 September 1997.

Plot
The wealthy Kapoor family consists of Madanlal, his wife Geeta, daughter Roshni, and son Gaurav. One day while Gaurav is returning home from a bank, he is attacked by a group of men led by Shiva, but a young man named Rohit Malhotra comes to his rescue. Gaurav hires Rohit in his firm, and both become fast and inseparable friends. Both unknowingly fall in love with the same woman, Shweta Sharma, but Gaurav finds out and decides to step away.

Shweta and Rohit are in love and want to get married. Then Shiva attacks Rohit and throws him off a cliff. Believing him to be dead, a shocked and devastated Shweta loses her voice. The Kapoors find out that Gaurav loves Shweta and they approach her brother, Shekhar, and arrange their marriage. They get engaged but Gaurav finds that he’s a brain tumour and he wants to bring back the long-lost happiness of Shweta. He finds a lookalike of Rohit who is Tony Braganza.

What Gaurav doesn't know is whether or not Tony is Rohit. Thus begins a merry-go-round of love, emotions, and sacrifice, all of which is 'Mohabbat'. In last scene, it is being revealed that Rohit has planned his murder after knowing the fact that the secret admirer of Shweta is none other than Gaurav and he’s in love with her. So, he decided to sacrifice his love for friendship. However, Gaurav finally gets to know that Tony is actually Rohit and Gaurav asks him to go back to Shweta. Lastly Gaurav dies due to his tumour and Shweta gets her voice back due to shock

Cast
Sanjay Kapoor as Gaurav M. Kapoor
Madhuri Dixit as Shweta Sharma
Akshaye Khanna as Rohit Malhotra / Tony Braganza
Farooq Sheikh as Shekhar Sharma, elder brother of Shweta
Tej Sapru as Dr. R.C. Goyal
Shiva Rindani as Shiva
M.F. Husain as himself (special appearance)
Arjun 
Saeed Jaffrey as Madanlal "Madan" Kapoor
Farida Jalal as Geetarani M.Kapoor
Kishore Bhanushali as Mechanic
Guddi Maruti as Khalajaan, Lady in black burqah
Sulabha Arya as Mrs.Malhotra
Ashwin Kaushal as Virendra "Viren" Gupta
Bob Brahmbhatt as Aslam
Babbanlal Yadav as Mr.Ramaswamy, Madrasi clerk
Raj Kamal as Doctor
Ghanshyam Rohera as Malhotra's landlord
Gurmeet as Office Clerk
Parnav Chowdhary as Staffer
Praveen Kumar as Mr.Sabharwal
Ranjan Kaushal as Kidnapper
Dinesh Hingoo as Shweta's Fan
Beena Banerjee

Music
"Mohabbat (1997)" music was composed by music duo "Nadeem-Shravan", and penned by Sameer and Reema Rakesh Nath.

References

External links
 

1990s Hindi-language films
Films scored by Nadeem–Shravan
1997 films
Indian romantic drama films
Films scored by Surinder Sodhi
1997 directorial debut films
1997 romantic drama films